A Bunch of Violets is a 1916 British silent drama film directed by Frank Wilson and starring Chrissie White, Gerald Lawrence and Violet Hopson. It is an adaptation of Sydney Grundy's 1894 play A Bunch of Violets.

Cast
 Chrissie White as Violet Marchant  
 Gerald Lawrence as Sir Philip Marchant  
 Violet Hopson as Mrs. Murgatroyd  
 Lionelle Howard as Harold Inglis 
 Margaret Halstan as Lady Marchant  
 Tom Mowbray as Mark Murgatroyd  
 Charles Vane as Harker

References

Bibliography
 Gifford, Denis. The Illustrated Who's Who in British Films. B.T. Batsford, 1978.

External links

1916 films
1916 drama films
British silent feature films
British drama films
Films directed by Frank Wilson
Films set in England
British films based on plays
British black-and-white films
Hepworth Pictures films
1910s English-language films
1910s British films
Silent drama films